Forni is an Italian surname. It may refer to:

Efrem Forni (1889–1976), Italian Roman Catholic cardinal
Giovanni Forni (athlete) ( 1920), Italian Olympic tug of war competitor
Giovanni Forni, Italian mathematician and researcher in the field of dynamical systems
Giuseppe Forni, Paralympic athlete from Switzerland
P. M. Forni (Pier Massimo, [1951–2018]), Italian-born academic and author; director of the Civility Project at Johns Hopkins University
Raffaele Forni (1906–1990), Swiss Roman Catholic archbishop
Raymond Forni (1941–2008), French socialist politician

See also
Forni (disambiguation)